Horní Cerekev is a town in Pelhřimov District in the Vysočina Region of the Czech Republic. It has about 1,800 inhabitants.

Administrative parts

Villages of Chrástov, Hříběcí, Těšenov and Turovka are administrative parts of Horní Cerekev.

Etymology
The settlement was originally named Líčkovice after its founder Líček and later renamed Cierkev, i.e. "church" in Old Czech. Later the name evolved into Cerekev and the attribute Horní ("upper") was added.

Geography
It lies on the Jihlava River. The town lies in the Křemešník Highlands, the area on the left bank of the Jihlava River extends into the Křižanov Highlands.

History
The first written mention of Horní Cerekev is from 1361. The most notable owners of the village was the Léskovec family, which ruled it from 1411 to 1655. The last noble owners, who held Horní Cerekev until 1945, was the House of Hohenzollern.

In 2000, the municipality was promoted to a town.

Sights
The Church of the Annunciation dates from 1384. The original wooden church gave the town its name and was later replaced by a stone one. It was extended and remodelled in the Baroque style in 1631 and 1763. After a fire in 1821, only one of its two towers was reconstructed.

A small fortress surrounded by moats was built in the 14th century. Between 1411 and 1655, it was gradually rebuilt in the Renaissance style. In 1720 and 1734, it was rebuilt into its current Baroque form.

Notable people
Josef Šejnost (1878–1941), sculptor
Josef Dvořák (born 1942), actor
Denisa Křížová (born 1994), ice hockey player

References

External links

Cities and towns in the Czech Republic
Populated places in Jihlava District